Ojciec Mateusz (English: Father Matthew) is a Polish television drama series, which has aired on TVP1 since November 11, 2008. It is a Polish version of the Italian detective series Don Matteo broadcast in Italy by Rai Uno.

The show is set in the town of Sandomierz, although scenes in the church are recorded in Glinianka near Otwock, the vicarage in Anin in Warsaw, and the office of the bishop is filmed in the Nieborów Palace. In the fourth series, some episodes take place outside of Sandomierz, including in Kielce, Bałtów, Krzyżtopór, Busko-Zdrój and Opatów, as well as Ćmielów, Wąchock and Zalew Sielpia.

Plot
The series shows the adventures of a Roman Catholic priest who, after returning to Poland from a mission to Belarus, is sent to work in a small parish in Sandomierz. As a pastor, together with a friendly policeman, he solves mysteries and gives help to his parishioners, as well as all those who are in need. Each episode is a separate story.

Main characters
 Father Mateusz Żmigrodzki (Artur Żmijewski) – a Catholic priest. After years of working in Belarus, he returns to Poland and takes a job as a priest in Sandomierz. He has a unique talent for solving crimes, which leads him to delve into many mysteries. He is extremely brilliant, intelligent and perceptive. In episodes in which he doesn't help to solve the case, he is often seen absolving the offender just before he or she gets arrested.
 Deputy Inspector Orest Możejko (Piotr Polk) - a police inspector. He is overbearing and always convinced he is right about his cases. He was initially skeptical about Father Mateusz's talents. He is a non-practicing Catholic atheist.
 Aspirant Mieczysław Nocul  (Michał Piela) - an Aspirant in the police and one of Orest Możejko's staff. At the beginning of the show he was a junior policeman, but has been gradually been promoted. He is a friend of Father Mateusz and co-operates with him, and in some episodes he actually solves the cases himself separately from Father Mateusz, meeting him as he tried to make the offender acknowledge their guilt and repent.
 Natalia Borowik (Kinga Preis)  - housekeeper at Father Mateusz's rectory. Grumpy, funny, loyal and devoted to the priest. Her musings often bring Father Mateusz inspiration for solving criminal problems.
 The Bishop (Sławomir Orzechowski) - the bishop of the diocese. He has known Father Mateusz for years and after Father Mateusz's return to Poland entrusts him with his new role in Sandomierz. Despite reports on the unconventional behaviour of Father Mateusz, often fuelled by the secretary - Father Jacek - he has full confidence in Father Mateusz and turns a blind eye to his detective work, although Mateusz does not overstep his boundaries and takes his job as a Catholic priest above everything else.
 Lucyna Wielicka (Aleksandra Górska) and Michał Wielicki (Maciej Musiał) – the inhabitants of the rectory. After their eviction from their home, and much to the dismay of Natalia, Father Mateusz decided to take the family under his roof, and they are treated like his relatives.
 Waldemar Grzelak "Bug" (Eryk Lubos) - a former prisoner. He currently lives in the rectory with Father Mateusz; he met him in prison when he was wrongfully accused of committing an offence, then he became one of Mateusz's friends.
 Justyna Malec (Tamara Arciuch) - the former Mayor of Sandomierz and now Editor-in-chief of the local newspaper, former love interest of Inspector Orest Możejko.
 Daria - Dominik's mother. She is a journalist and travels a lot, and is the wife of Orest Możejko. 
 Dominik - Orest Możejko and Daria's son.

Cast

Episodes

Father Mateusz for Sandomierz

As a result of the floods that hit central Europe in 2010, a charity concert was held in Sandomierz's Old Town on June 19, 2010 to help those who had suffered. A number of actors including Artur Zmijewski, Kinga Preis, Michael Piela, Piotr Polk and Tamara Arciuch from Ojciec Mateusz, musicians Andrzej Piaseczny, Artur Gadowski, Łukasz Zagrobelny, and bands including Big Cyc, Pectus, and Blue Café participated.

Artur Zmijewski led the concert along with journalist and TV presenter Paulina Chylewska and the event was broadcast on June 19, 2010 on TVP1.

Awards

 The "Telekamera 2011" for Best Drama weekly awarded for 2010 by the readers of Tele Week in February 2011.
 The "Telekamera 2017" for Best Drama awarded for 2016 by the readers of Tele Week in February 2017.
 The "Telekamera 2019" for Best Drama awarded for 2018 by the readers of Tele Week in February 2019.
 The "Golden Telekamera 2020"

See also
 Don Matteo

Bibliography
 Filmweb (in Polish)
 FilmPolski (in Polish)
 Official program page (in Polish)

References

External links

Official program page (in Polish)

Polish drama television series
Polish television series
2008 Polish television series debuts
2000s Polish television series
2010s Polish television series
2020s Polish television series
Telewizja Polska original programming